Premonition is an album by the American jazz instrumentalist Paul McCandless, recorded in 1992 for Windham Hill Records.

Critical reception

The Washington Post noted that the music falls in "the emotionally evocative but unchallenging territory that lies between new age and fusion." The Gazette determined that "at times the dreaded contemporary beat moves into MoR territory."

Track listing
 "Robin" - 3:54
 "Punch" - 5:48
 "Rainland" - 4:53
 "Two Moons" - 5:32
 "At First Sight" - 4:36
 "Winter Creeper" - 4:56
 "Last Bloom" - 3:01
 "Rendezvous" - 4:26
 "Can't Stop The Wind" - 5:13
 "Premonition" - 2:17
 "Turning To You" - 5:28
 "Robin Reprise" - 1:14
Recorded and mixed October - December 1991 at Chicago Recording Co., Chicago, IL, October 1991

Personnel
Paul McCandless - English Horn, Oboe, Soprano Sax, Synthesizer
Steve Rodby - Bass
Gary Brown - Electric Bass
John Burr - Keyboards
Steve Cardenas - Guitar
William Kennedy - Drums
Lyle Mays - Piano
Fred Simon - Synthesizer
Mark Walker - Drums, Percussion
Rich Breen - Recording Engineer, Mix Engineer

References

External links
http://www.discogs.com/Paul-McCandless-Premonition/release/3238090

Paul McCandless albums
1992 albums